Carlo Nayaradou (5 June 1957 – 16 January 2021) was a French comic book author. Active in Metropolitan France and Martinique, he sought to create a comic strip in Creole.

Publications
Kréyon noir (1995)
Éreksyon (2018)
Ma liberté d'expression ! (2018)
Images vs mots (2018)
Bien le bonjour des Antilles, Mr le Ministre (2018)

References

1957 births
2021 deaths
French comics writers
Martiniquais writers
Creole-language writers
People from Fort-de-France